"Crazy" is a song by the Australian rock/synthpop band Icehouse, from the Man of Colours album, the single peaked at Number 4 on the Australian Kent Music Report. The song was written by band members Iva Davies, Robert Kretschmer and Andy Qunta, and produced by David Lord.

Music videos
Two versions of the music video exist; an Australian version, and a version for US markets.

Australian version
The Australian version features Davies wandering through the unused Pyrmont Power Station in Sydney while various events occur around him, such as explosions, a car crashing and various people wandering through the scene. It was shot in one continuous take.

US release
The US version was directed by John Jopson.

It is based on Play Misty for Me, with Davies hosting a late night radio show, and taking a request from a fan (the actress Paris Jefferson), who asks "do you mind if I wake you tonight?". Davies misinterprets this as the request, but the caller goes on to say "can you play 'Crazy' for me?". The rest of the video shows Icehouse singing and playing instruments in a large mansion. The final scene shows Davies meeting the caller, who has posters of Icehouse and Iva Davies plastered all over her wall. Davies gives a short uneasy smile, before leaving the house.

The International (US) Version was filmed in the Blue Mountains of New South Wales, Australia.

Track listing

Australian release (7")
 "Crazy"
 "Completely Gone"

US promo release (12")
 "Crazy (12" Mix)"
 "Crazy (Midnight Mix)"
 "Crazy (LP version)"
 "No Promises (Live)

Charts

Weekly charts

Year-end charts

References

1987 singles
1987 songs
Icehouse (band) songs
Songs written by Iva Davies
Regular Records singles
Chrysalis Records singles
Songs written by Andy Qunta